The Federation of Non-Life Insurance Workers' Unions of Japan (FNIU; , Sonpo Roren) is a trade union representing workers in the insurance industry in Japan.

The union was founded in 1967, with the merger of the Zennihonsongai Labor Union, the Koa Labour Union, and the Ozumi Shoji Labour Union.  The union remained independent until 1997, when it became affiliated with the Japanese Trade Union Confederation.  It had 68,027 members by 2009, and grew to 94,696 members by 2020.

External links

References

Insurance industry trade unions
Trade unions established in 1967
Trade unions in Japan